Ady is a surname. Notable people with the surname include:

 Cindy Ady (born 1956/57), Canadian politician
 Endre Ady (1877–1919), Hungarian poet and journalist
 Mariska Ady (1888–1977), Hungarian writer and poet, niece of Endre
 Thomas Ady (fl. 17th century), English physician and humanist
 William Ady (1816–1882), English archdeacon
 William M. Ady (died 1872), American politician